is a Godzilla clone kaiju that first appeared in Toho's 1994 film Godzilla vs. SpaceGodzilla, as the main antagonist.

Overview

Appearance
SpaceGodzilla largely resembles his earthly counterpart, but with several key differences. In addition to having greatly increased musculature, a more bestial face with tusks, a long tail and a piercing, high pitched roar (a slowed down and higher-pitched version of Gigan's roar), SpaceGodzilla bears several features that are a result of the merger with a crystalline organism in outer space. Instead of Godzilla's dorsal spines, SpaceGodzilla has rows of white crystals running down his tail and up his back. He also has a yellow-gold crystal 'crest' on the top of his head, three large crystals at the tip of his tail, and two massive crystals erupting from his shoulders, which serve to draw energy from the environment around him. SpaceGodzilla is predominantly navy blue in colour with a  dark reddish-purple underbelly.

Development

The character was designed as a homage to the monster's hinted progenitor Biollante by incorporating tusks and a hissing roar reminiscent of the latter monster. Creature designer Shinji Nishikawa had initially envisioned SpaceGodzilla as a much more Western dragon-like creature with large fin-like wings on the back. Other early designs for the proposed "Astrogodzilla" included it being an albino Godzilla with expansive wings, two tails, and the ability to fire an ice ray. Another design for SpaceGodzilla had the character be a quadruped or a much more Biollante-like monster commanding a horde of cosmic dragonflies. The final design bore greater resemblance to Godzilla's final form from the video game Super Godzilla, itself also designed by Nishikawa. Special effects artist Koichi Kawakita decided to incorporate crystals onto the SpaceGodzilla design, and added a prominent horn on the creature's head in order to hint at its power and imply it had radar abilities.

In its debut film, SpaceGodzilla's origins are left ambiguous, but it is theorized that it was born through Godzilla cells (transported into space either by Mothra or Biollante's spores) being exposed to the radiation of a black hole. SpaceGodzilla heads for Earth and traps Little Godzilla in a crystalline prison, before travelling to Fukuoka and forming a crystal fortress which drains the city of power, channels it through Fukuoka Tower and transfers it to SpaceGodzilla. It is ultimately stopped through the combined efforts of Godzilla and M.O.G.U.E.R.A.

Reception
While the film received mixed reactions, SpaceGodzilla was generally well received. DVD Cult said, "The monster SpaceGodzilla is excellently designed, and is certainly far more menacing than anything Dean Devlin and Roland Emmerich ever dreamed up." Toho Kingdom praised his theme music, and said "SpaceGodzilla has a nice, hectic, theme that suits him and works well when used throughout the movie," while Complex listed the character as number 11 on its "The 15 Most Badass Kaiju Monsters of All Time" list, calling him "probably the most powerful thing Godzilla has ever faced". However, the character's design was criticized by Godzilla historian Steve Ryfle, who stated that, although evil-looking, it was too evocative of the haphazardly designed monsters of the generally low-quality Godzilla films of the 1970s like Hedorah and Gigan.

Fictional character biography

Godzilla vs. SpaceGodzilla (1994)
SpaceGodzilla was created when Godzilla cells cast into space fell into a black hole and reemerged from a white hole, starting to assimilate crystalline organisms while rapidly evolving, the final result being SpaceGodzilla. How Godzilla's cells were cast into space is unknown, but there are two reasons stated in the film. Mothra may have brought his cells into space after her battle with Battra in Godzilla vs. Mothra. Another suggestion is that when Biollante's spores flew into space, some of her G-cells were responsible for the creation of the space demon. After being born, the Combat Creature was sighted flying through space in his flying form as he destroyed a NASA satellite. The penguin mecha MOGUERA was deployed to attack him, but was ultimately defeated. He later set his sights on Birth Island, home of Godzilla and his son. He captured LittleGodzilla using his telekinetic crystals, forming a prison around the Godzillasaurus cub. He left the island and set up his crystal fortress in Fukuoka, but MOGUERA tried to stop him. SpaceGodzilla overpowered the giant robotic penguin until he teamed up with Godzilla and split into two parts, Land Moguera and the Star Falcon. Land Moguera went for the foundation of his fortress as the King of the Monsters razed the Fukuoka Tower, knowing it was the source of his cosmic clone's power. Godzilla and MOGUERA fought SpaceGodzilla, with MOGUERA blasting the heinous space monster's shoulder crystals, critically weakening him. In pain and anger, SpaceGodzilla destroyed MOGUERA, but not before the punisher penguin knocked him down. His opponent down for the count, Godzilla used his red spiral heat ray several times at his foe, as SpaceGodzilla slowly died. Like Biollante, he exploded into spores and was finally destroyed.

Appearances

Film
 Godzilla vs. SpaceGodzilla (1994)

Video games
 Godzilla Trading Battle (PlayStation - 1998)
 Godzilla: Save the Earth (Xbox, PS2 - 2004)
 Godzilla: Unleashed (Wii, PS2 - 2007) - original kaijus Krystalak and Obsidius were born from SpaceGodzilla's crystals
 Godzilla Unleashed: Double Smash (NDS - 2007) - as boss
 Godzilla: The Game (PS4 - 2015)
 Godzilla Defense Force (2019)

Literature
 Godzilla vs. SpaceGodzilla (manga - 1994)
 Godzilla: Ongoing (comic - 2012)
 Godzilla: The Half-Century War (comic - 2012–2013)
 Godzilla: Rulers of Earth (comic - 2013–2015)
 Godzilla in Hell (comic - 2015)

Other games
 Ikoria: Lair of the Behemoths, a Magic: The Gathering expansion. The promotional card was renamed due to Spacegodzilla's weapon, the Corona Beam, being too similarly named to the concurrent COVID-19 pandemic.

References

Godzilla characters
Extraterrestrial supervillains
Fictional mutants
Science fiction film characters
Fantasy film characters
Fictional characters with superhuman strength
Fictional mass murderers
Fictional telekinetics
Film characters introduced in 1994
Kaiju
Fictional monsters
Horror film villains
Video game bosses